Nikolai Yefimovich Andrianov (14 October 1952 – 21 March 2011) was a Soviet and Russian gymnast.

He held the record for men for the most Olympic medals at 15 (7 gold medals, 5 silver medals, 3 bronze medals) until Michael Phelps surpassed him at the 2008 Beijing Summer Olympics. Andrianov is the third athlete (male or female) in cumulative Olympic medals after Phelps's 28 and Larisa Latynina's 18. Andrianov won the most medals at the 1976 Summer Olympics with 6 individual medals and one team medal. Within the sport of Men's Artistic Gymnastics, he also holds the men's record for most individual Olympic medals (12) and shares the male record for most individual Olympic gold medals in gymnastics (6) with Boris Shakhlin and Dmitry Bilozerchev (the latter of which only if you count the 1984 Alternate Olympics). In many other rankings among all-time medal winners at the Olympic, World, and European levels, he ranks very high (for example, he is second only to Vitaly Scherbo in total individual medal counts at either the gold level or any level at the combined Olympic and World levels as well as at the combined Olympic, World, and European levels), easily making him one of the most decorated gymnasts of all time.

Early life and Olympic career 
Andrianov entered the Children and Youth Sports School of the Burevestnik sports society in Vladimir at age 11. His first international success came in 1971 at the European Championships in Madrid, where he won two gold medals. Between 1971 and 1980 he won many international gymnastics competitions, including the Olympic Games, world championships and European championships.

Andrianov's first Olympic medal was a gold in the 1972 floor competition. He dominated the 1976 gymnastics competition, winning four golds, including the all-around, two silvers, and a bronze. These medals included golds in the floor exercises, rings, and vault, as well as a prized gold in the 1976 all-around. His record of four gymnastic golds at a single games stood until Vitaly Scherbo won six other medals in 1992.

Andrianov took the Olympic Oath for athletes at the 1980 Summer Olympics in Moscow. In the gymnastics competition, he won two more golds, two silvers, and a bronze. Andrianov's golds in that Olympics were in the vault and team competition, his silvers were in the all-around and floor exercises, and his bronze medal was in the horizontal bar. He retired shortly after that year's Olympics.

Later life 
Andrianov married another famous Soviet gymnast, two-time Olympic champion Lyubov Burda. Together they worked as children's gymnastics coaches, with Andrianov being the head coach of the Soviet national men's junior team in 1981–1992. In 1990–1992 he also coached the Soviet senior gymnastics team, and in 1990–1993 headed the Soviet and later the Russian Gymnastics Federation.

In 2001, Andrianov was inducted into the International Gymnastics Hall of Fame. Between 1994 and 2002 he coached the Japan Olympic gymnastics team, on the invitation of his former rival, Mitsuo Tsukahara. Andrianov coached Tsukahara's son, Naoya Tsukahara, and both father and son credit him with raising Naoya's skills and confidence to equip him to compete at the international level. In 2002 he became the director of gymnastics at the N.G. Tolkachyov Specialized Children and Youth sports school in Vladimir, where he first began the sport as a youth.

Illness and death 
In his final years, Andrianov developed the degenerative neurological disorder multiple system atrophy and in his final months was unable to move his arms or legs or talk. Andrianov died on 21 March 2011 at the age of 58, in his hometown of Vladimir. Russia's national gymnastic team coach, Alexander Alexandrov, called the death "tragic", but stated that he had been ill for a long time.

Achievements (non-Olympic)

Honours and awards
Order of Lenin
Order of the Badge of Honour
Order of the Red Banner of Labour
Medal "For Labour Valour"
Lenin Komsomol Prize

See also

List of multiple Olympic medalists
List of multiple Summer Olympic medalists
List of multiple Olympic gold medalists
List of multiple Olympic medalists at a single Games
List of multiple Olympic gold medalists at a single Games
List of Olympic medal leaders in men's gymnastics

References

External links

 International Federation of Gymnastics' Article on Nikolai Andrianov
 A short biography and achievements
 Biography
IOC 1980 Summer Olympics
 
IOC 1980 Summer Olympics
 Obituary Nikolai Andrianov

|-

|-

1952 births
2011 deaths
People from Vladimir, Russia
Burevestnik (sports society) athletes
Communist Party of the Soviet Union members
Gymnasts at the 1972 Summer Olympics
Gymnasts at the 1976 Summer Olympics
Gymnasts at the 1980 Summer Olympics
Medalists at the 1980 Summer Olympics
Medalists at the 1976 Summer Olympics
Medalists at the 1972 Summer Olympics
Medalists at the World Artistic Gymnastics Championships
Honoured Masters of Sport of the USSR
Merited Coaches of the Soviet Union
Recipients of the Lenin Komsomol Prize
Recipients of the Order of Lenin
Recipients of the Order of the Red Banner of Labour
Olympic gold medalists for the Soviet Union
Olympic silver medalists for the Soviet Union
Olympic bronze medalists for the Soviet Union
Olympic gymnasts of the Soviet Union
Olympic medalists in gymnastics
Russian male artistic gymnasts
Soviet male artistic gymnasts
World champion gymnasts
Universiade medalists in gymnastics
Oath takers at the Olympic Games
Universiade gold medalists for the Soviet Union
Sportspeople from Vladimir Oblast
Medalists at the 1973 Summer Universiade
European champions in gymnastics
Neurological disease deaths in Russia
Deaths from multiple system atrophy